George Wagoner could refer to: 

George Chester Robinson Wagoner (1863–1946), American politician 
Rick Wagoner (George Richard Wagoner Jr., born 1953), American businessman and former CEO of General Motors

See also
George Wagner (disambiguation)